TENS or tens may refer to:

Numbers and years
 Second column of magnitude in the decimal system
 10 (number)
 10s, the decade from January 1, 10 AD to December 31, 19 AD
 The years 10–19 of any century; see List of decades

Medical
 Transcutaneous electrical nerve stimulation, electric current therapy
 Toxic epidermal necrolysis, a skin condition

Other
 The Emperor's New School, a cartoon series
 Rugby tens, a variant of rugby union
Trusted End Node Security, a computer operating system

See also
 Ten (disambiguation)
 Tense (disambiguation)
 Teen (disambiguation)